Frederik Petrus Nel (born 23 March 1970) is a South African politician who has served as a Member of the Gauteng Provincial Legislature since May 2009, representing the Democratic Alliance. He is the DA's Gauteng Shadow MEC for Roads and Transport. Nel was elected as the DA provincial chairperson in 2020.

Early life and education
Nel was born in Pretoria on 23 March 1970. He matriculated from Hoërskool Waterkloof in 1987. He earned a BA Honours degree in Geography from the University of Pretoria. Nel worked  in public relations, tourism marketing, market research and corporate social investment consulting before he became active in politics.

Political career
Nel started his political career in 1988 on the UP campus and was elected the Democratic Party's National Youth Leader in 1992. He was elected as a DP councillor in the Greater Pretoria Metropolitan Council in 1998. In 2000, Nel was elected to the City of Tshwane Metropolitan Municipality council as a member of the Democratic Alliance. He was appointed caucus chief whip. Nel became caucus leader in 2003. In 2009, Nel was elected to the Gauteng Provincial Legislature. After his re-election in 2014, Nel was appointed Shadow MEC for Local Government and Human Settlements by DA caucus leader John Moodey. In 2016, he was appointed Shadow MEC for Roads and Transport.

He was re-elected to another term in 2019. Newly elected DA caucus leader Solly Msimanga announced that Nel would remain in his post. He is currently a member of the Roads & Transport Committee and the DA's constituency contact in Mamelodi West.

In 2020, Nel announced his candidacy to succeed Michael Moriarty as provincial chairperson of the DA. He went up against the DA's chairperson in Ekurhuleni, Selby Thekiso. He won the election on 14 November 2020 with 67% of the vote. Bongani Nkomo was elected his deputy.

Personal life
Nel has three children named Caroux Nel , Derik Nel and Stefan Nel.

References

External links

Living people
1970 births
Afrikaner people
People from Pretoria
Democratic Alliance (South Africa) politicians
Members of the Gauteng Provincial Legislature
University of Pretoria alumni
21st-century South African politicians
Democratic Party (South Africa) politicians